is a Japanese professional Go player.

Biography
Kazumi was born in Hamamatsu, Shizuoka Prefecture, Japan. He is a student of Toshio Sakai.

Promotion record

References

External links
 Nihon Ki-in profile (Japanese)
 GoBase.org profile
 Sensei's Library profile

1951 births
Japanese Go players
Living people